The Lakeland Central School District is a public school district in New York State, serving approximately 5200 students in  of the towns of Yorktown, Cortlandt and Somers in Westchester County; and the towns of Carmel, Philipstown, and Putnam Valley in Putnam County. It is the largest suburban school district (by area) in Westchester County and a member of the Putnam/Northern Westchester BOCES.

The average class size ranges from 19-24 students and the student-teacher ratio is 13:1.

The district's main office is in Shrub Oak, New York. Dr. Karen Gagliardi is the acting Superintendent of Schools.

Board of Education
The Board of Education (BOE) consists of 9 members who reside in the Lakeland Central School District. Members serve staggered 3-year terms. Elections are held each May for board members and to vote on the School District Budget.

Current board members are:

As of July 1, 2019 the nine-member board includes:

Becky Burfeind
Trustee,
Cortlandt Manor
Term ends: 2022

Angela Conti,
Trustee,
Cortlandt Manor,
Term Ends: 2021

Michael Daly, 
President,
Yorktown Heights,
Term Ends: 2021

Adam E. Kaufman,
Trustee
Yorktown Heights
Term Ends: 2022

Denise Kness, 
Vice President,  
Yorktown Hts., 
Term Ends: 2020

Glen P. Malia, 
Trustee, 
Cortlandt Manor,
Term Ends: 2020

Robert E. Mayes,
Trustee,
Cortlandt Manor,
Term Ends: 2022

Rachelle Nardelli,  
Shrub Oak (Yorktown),
Term Ends: 2020

Karen Pressman,
Trustee,
Cortlandt Manor, 
Term Ends: 2021

History
In 1951, the Shrub Oak, Toddville, and Van Cortlandtville school districts combined to become the Lakeland School District. Lakeland School District officially began operating in 1952. At its peak in 1973, the district served 8,594 students before dropping to its current levels of around 5,600 students.

Schools
The Lakeland Central Central School District operates five elementary schools, one Middle school, and two high schools across the district.

Elementary Schools (K-5)
Benjamin Franklin Elementary School (Yorktown Heights)
George Washington Elementary School (Mohegan Lake)
Lincoln-Titus Elementary School (Crompond)
Thomas Jefferson Elementary School  (Yorktown Heights)
Van Cortlandtville Elementary School (Mohegan Lake)

Middle Schools (6-8)
Lakeland Copper Beech Middle School (Yorktown Heights)

High Schools (9-12)
Lakeland High School (Shrub Oak)
Walter Panas High School (Cortlandt Manor)

Performance
Lakeland Copper Beech Middle School has been selected as a National School to Watch, an initiative by the US Education Department to recognize high performance by schools.

For the 2016-2017 school year, 97% of graduates attended either 4-year colleges or 2-year colleges.

Lakeland High School's Girls Field Hockey team has won the New York State Class B Championship for nine years in a row (2009-2018) and 12 total state titles.

Walter Panas High School Girls Volleyball is the two-time Class A New York State Champion  (2016, 2017).

The PTAs at Benjamin Franklin, Lincoln-Titus, Thomas Jefferson, and Van Cortlandtville elementary schools have been named National PTA Schools of Excellence.

In popular culture

Melissa Gonzalez, member of the USA Women's Olympic Field Hockey Team

In June 2007, singer and actress Vanessa L. Williams came to Lincoln-Titus Elementary school to explain to the 5th graders what an acting career is like.

In April 2016 David Adler, a famous author, came to Thomas Jefferson Elementary School to talk to 5th graders how he gets inspiration for his writing.

Notable Graduates:
T.C. Boyle, author, also taught at Lakeland High School from 1968 to 1972

Lawrence Lindsey (1972), economist, former member of the Board of Governors of the Federal Reserve, professor at Harvard University

Jeffrey Herbst, Graduate Walter Panas High School, Former President, Colgate University

References

External links
Lakeland Central Schools web site
New York State School Boards Association

School districts in New York (state)
Education in Westchester County, New York
School districts established in 1951